Bandar or Bunder (in Persian بندر) is a Persian word meaning "port" and "haven". Etymologically it combines Persian بند Band (enclosed) and در dar (gate, door) meaning "an enclosed area" (i.e. protected from the sea) derived from Sanskrit/Avestan Bandha (to tieup) and Dwara (entrance). The word travelled with Persian sailors over a wide area leading to several coastal places in Iran and elsewhere having Bandar (haven) as part of their names. In some Indian languages the word Bandargah means "port". In Indonesian Malay it means "port". In Assamese-Bengali languages "bondor" means port.

Places 

Various ports around the world derive their names from the word "bandar". Some of them are listed (country-wise) below.

Bangladesh
 Bandar Upazila
 Bandar Thana

India
The west coast of India, with its historic links to Persia, has several place names that include the word bunder.
The city of Bombay historically had a number of piers along its waterfronts, each named after the cargo it typically handled (or at times a landmark or important personality). The piers have long gone, but the place names continue to be used today. A coastal town in Andhra Pradesh by name Machilipatnam is also called Bandar by the local people over there. These include:
 Apollo Bunder
 Akhtar Bunder
 Arthur Bunder
 Ballard Bunder
 Boree Bunder (boree = sack or bag)
 Brick Bunder
 Carnac Bunder
 Chendani Bunder
 Chinch Bunder
 Chincholi Bunder
 Colsa Bunder (colsa = coal)
 Dana Bunder (dana = grain)
 Ghod Bunder (ghod = horses)
 Haji Bunder
 Hay Bunder
 Kerosene Bunder
 Lakdi Bunder (lakdi = timber)
 Masjid Bunder (masjid = mosque - however, this pier was named after the Gate of Mercy Synagogue)
 Machilipatnam or Masulipatnam is also called Bundaru by Andhra people in Andhra Pradesh
 Mith Bunder
 Nagla Bunder
 Reti Bunder (reti = sand)
 Tank Bunder
 Wadi Bunder
 Zakaria Bunder
Similarly, in the state of Gujarat, several town names include the word bunder:
 Bhavnagar
 Ferry Bunder
 Old Bunder
 Billimoria
 Vakharia Bunder
 Jambusar
 Kavi Bunder
 Tankari Bunder
 Jamnagar
 Bedi Bunder
 Salaya Bunder
 Sikka Bunder
 Rozi Bunder
 Vadinar Bunder
 Kandla
 Jafarwadi Bunder
 Tuna Bunder
 Porbunder
 Valsad
 Valsad Bunder
 Veraval Bunder
 Bhidiya Bunder
 Khadi Bunder
 Nava Bunder
 Veraval Bunder
 Sanjan
 Sanjan Bunder

Indonesia
 Banda Aceh
 Bandar Lampung
 Banjarmasin

Iran
 Bandar Abbas
 Bandar Anzali
 Bandar Imam
 Bandar Lengeh
 Bandar Torkman
 Bandar Charak
 Bandar-e Olya
 Bandar-e Sofla, Mazandaran
 Bandar, Isfahan
 Bandar, Kermanshah
 Bandar, Yazd
 Bondar (disambiguation)
 Bandor (disambiguation)

Malaysia
 Bandar Baru Bangi
 Bandar Bayan Baru
 Bandar Tun Razak
 Bandar Samariang
 Bandar Seberang Jaya
 Bandar Seri Putra
 Bandar Sri Damansara

Oman
 Bandar Khayran
 Bandah Jadidah
 Bandar Jissah

Pakistan
 Keti Bandar
 Shamal Bandar

Somalia and the East African Coast
 Bandar Beyla
 Boosaaso, formerly known as Bandar Qaasim
 A coastal region of Somalia is called Banaadir, however Arab geographers applied the term historically to all port cities of the East African coast, from Somalia to Mozambique.

Other countries
 Bandar el-Mansura, Egypt
 Bandar Seri Begawan, capital of Brunei
 Bandar, Afghanistan
 Bandar, India
 The Bund, a district in Shanghai, China
 Bandara, linked to original Persian "port", A name, a title, for a clan of chieftains in central highlands of Sri Lanka, whose origins date back to early migrations from Northwest India.

References

Place name etymologies
Persian words and phrases
Bengali words and phrases